Grammar of the Gothic Language is a book by Joseph Wright describing the extinct Gothic language, first published in 1910. It includes the language's development from Proto-Indo-European (then known as Indo-Germanic) and Proto-Germanic (Primitive Germanic), and part of Ulfilas's bible translation. It superseded Wright's earlier A Primer of the Gothic Language, and has been reprinted many times throughout the 20th century.

External links
Grammar of the Gothic Language available at ling.upenn.edu

1910 non-fiction books
Grammar books
Gothic language
Clarendon Press books